Andrzej Wojciech Suski (born 24 December 1941) is a retired Polish Roman Catholic prelate.

Born in Płock, Suski was ordained to the priesthood in 1965. He served as Auxiliary Bishop of Płock from 1986 to 1992, when he became the Bishop of Toruń. He retired in November 2017.

References

External links

 Andrzej Suski at Catholic-Hierarchy.org

1941 births
Living people
People from Płock
20th-century Roman Catholic bishops in Poland
21st-century Roman Catholic bishops in Poland